Ranthambore Fort lies within the Ranthambore National Park, near the city of Sawai Madhopur in Sawai Madhopur district of Rajasthan, India. the park being the former hunting grounds of the Maharajahs of Jaipur until the time of  India's Independence. It is a formidable fort having been a focal point of the historical developments of Rajasthan. The fort is believed to be constructed by the Chahamanas. In the 13th century the Delhi Sultanate captured it for a brief time. The fort provides a panoramic view of the surrounding Ranthambore National Park and is now a popular tourist attraction.

In 2013, at the 37th session of the World Heritage Committee, Ranthambore Fort, along with 5 other forts of Rajasthan, was declared a UNESCO World Heritage Site under the group Hill Forts of Rajasthan.

History 
The oldest settlement in the area near Sawai Madhopur was around the Ranthambhore fort. The exact origin of the Ranthambore fort is still disputed but it is generally accepted that there was a settlement at the site of the Fort, as far back as the 8th century A.D. It is widely believed that the construction of the Ranthambhore Fort was started during the reign of the Chauhan Rajput King Sapaldaksha in 944 AD. Another theory stipulates that King Jayant, also a Chauhan rajput, built the Ranthambore Fort during 1110 AD. It is most likely that the construction of the fort commenced during the mid 10th Century A.D. and continued for a few centuries after that.

Under Chauhans 

Its earlier name was Ranastambhapura (Sanskrit: Raṇa-sthaṃba-pura, "City of the Battle Post"). It was associated with Jainism during the reign of Prithviraja I of Chahamana (Chauhan) dynasty in the 12th century. Siddhasenasuri, who lived in the 12th century has included this place in the list of holy Jain tirthas. In the Mughal period, a temple of Mallinatha was built in the fort.

After the defeat of Prithviraja III (Prithviraj Chauhan) in 1192 CE, the fort came under the control of the Muslim Ghurid ruler Muhammad of Ghor.

The Delhi Sultan Iltutmish captured Ranthambore in 1226, but the Chauhans recaptured it after his death in 1236. The armies of Sultan Nasiruddin Mahmud, led by the future Sultan Balban, unsuccessfully besieged the fortress in 1248 and 1253, but captured from Jaitrasingh Chauhan in 1259. Shakti Dev succeeded Jaitrasingh in 1283, and recaptured Ranthambore and enlarged the kingdom. Sultan Jalal ud din Firuz Khalji briefly besieged the fort in 1290-91 but was unsuccessful in capturing it. In 1299, Hammiradeva sheltered Muhammad Shah, a rebel general of Sultan Ala ud din Khalji, and refused to turn him over to the Sultan. The Sultan besieged and conquered the fort in 1301.

Under Mewar 
The fortress was captured by various kings of Mewar. Ranthambore was under the direct rule of Rana Hamir Singh (1326–1364), Rana Kumbha (1433–1468) and Rana Sanga (1508–1528).

Under Hadas 

During Rana Udai Singh I's reign (1468–1473) the fortress passed to the Hada Rajputs of Bundi. Sultan Bahadur Shah of Gujarat briefly captured the fortress from 1532 to 1535. The Mughal Emperor Akbar captured the fortress in Siege of Ranthambore (1568) from Hadas.

Under Jaipur  
The fortress passed to the Kachwaha Maharajas of Jaipur in the 17th century, and it remained part of Jaipur state until Indian Independence. The area surrounding the fortress became a hunting ground for the Maharajas of Jaipur. Jaipur state acceded to India in 1949, becoming part of the state of Rajasthan in 1950.

Temples 
Inside Ranthambore fort, there are three Hindu temples dedicated to Ganesha, Shiva and Ramlalaji constructed in 12th and 13th centuries from red Karauli stone. There is also a Jain temple of Lord Sumatinath (5th Jain Tirthankar) and Lord Sambhavanath.

Nearby attractions 
Water gateways
Kachida Valley
Surwal Lake
Sitla Mata

Picnic sports
Malik Talao

Wild life
Bakula
Lakarda And Anantpura
Rajbagh Talao
Ranthambore National Park

Historical places
Jogi Mahal
Padam Talao
Raj Bagh Ruins
Ranthambhore Fort
Ranthambhore School Of Art
Ganesha temple
Jain Temple

Gallery

See also 
 Hill Forts of Rajasthan
 Chamatkarji
 Sawai Madhopur District
 Sawai Madhopur
 Rajiv Gandhi Regional Museum of Natural History
 Shilpgram, Sawai Madhopur
 Sawai Madhopur railway station

References

External links 

 

Forts in Rajasthan
Rajput era
Tourist attractions in Sawai Madhopur district
World Heritage Sites in India
10th-century establishments in India
Buildings and structures completed in 944